The 2018 Trans-Am Series season was the fiftieth running of the Sports Car Club of America's Trans-Am Series. It began on March 2 at Sebring International Raceway and ran for twelve rounds.

Schedule

National Championship

West Coast Championship

Changes
Homestead and Atlanta have swapped places.
The rounds at Brainerd International Raceway and New Jersey Motorsports Park have been dropped.
Pittsburgh is new to the schedule.

Race results

National Championship 
TA, TA3, TA4 competed together at all events except Pittsburgh, where TA ran a dedicated race and a separate race was held for TA3 and TA4, and at Daytona, where all classes competed together. TA2 competed in a dedicated race at all events except Daytona. Overall winners in bold.

West Coast Championship 
All classes raced together on track, except in the meetings shared with the National Championship. Bold indicates overall winner.

Entries

TA

Footnotes

References

Trans-Am Series
Trans-Am